Tripteridia latistriga is a moth in the family Geometridae. It is found in New Guinea and on Borneo. The habitat consists of mountainous areas.

References

Moths described in 1906
Tripteridia